Kole Sur Lukenie Airport  is an airport serving Kole in Sankuru Province, Democratic Republic of the Congo.

Charter services
There are no regularly scheduled commercial or charter services to Kole. However, aid and missionary services like MAF and AirServ fly there on an irregular basis about a dozen times per year.

See also

Transport in the Democratic Republic of the Congo
List of airports in the Democratic Republic of the Congo

References

External links
 HERE Maps - Kole
 OpenStreetMap - Kole
 OurAirports - Kole Sur Lukenie Airport
 

Airports in Sankuru